The Downtown Roswell Historic District is a  historic district which was listed on the National Register of Historic Places in 1985. Roughly bounded by 8th St., Richardson Ave., Albuquerque St. and Missouri Ave. in Roswell, the district included 298 contributing buildings.

It covers about 38 city blocks and 433 properties, mostly residences besides commercial properties along West Second Street, including non-contributing ones.  It covers the area of four residential subdivisions created during 1887 to 1899.

The district includes the James Phelps White House, which is separately listed on the National Register.

References

National Register of Historic Places in New Mexico
Victorian architecture in New Mexico
Chaves County, New Mexico
Historic districts on the National Register of Historic Places in New Mexico